A ricetto was a small fortified area used in medieval Italian villages for  storing agricultural products, livestock, and working tools.  It was also sometimes used for protection of the residents in case of attack, particularly from marauders and bands of soldiers and mercenaries from invading armies.  A ricetto typically consisted of multiple buildings enclosed within a thick pentagonal perimeter, sometimes accompanied by a guard tower.

Bibliography
 Centini, Massimo (2010), Guida insolita ai misteri, ai segreti, alle leggende e alle curiosità dei castelli del Piemonte, Newton Compton Editori.
 Settia, Aldo A. (2001), L'illusione della sicurezza: fortificazioni di rifugio nell'Italia medievale, ricetti, bastite, cortine, Società per gli studi storici, archeologici e artistici della provincia di Cuneo.

Architecture in Italy
Fortifications by type
Fortifications in Italy